The Nevill Mott Medal and Prize is an award presented in selected years by the Institute of Physics in the United Kingdom, for distinguished research in condensed matter or materials physics. It was first established in 1997 thanks to a donation from Sir Nevill Mott's family. Sir Nevill Mott was one of the outstanding British condensed matter theorists and won a Nobel Prize in Physics in 1977. He died in 1996. The award consists of a silver medal and a prize of £1000.

Nevill Mott Medal and Prize recipients
The following have received the Nevill Mott Medal and Prize:

2022 Colin John Lambert, Lancaster University. "For visionary theories of quantum-interference-enhanced, molecular-scale electron and phonon transport, which underpin recent designs for molecular-scale memories, sensors, switches and ultra-thin-film thermoelectric materials."
2021 Richard J Warburton, University of Basel. "For pioneering work in semiconductor quantum dots and solid-state quantum optics, especially the invention and application of Coulomb blockade devices to create coherent spin-photon interfaces and quantum light sources."
2020 Laurence Eaves, University of Nottingham. "For his outstanding contributions to the investigations of fundamental electronic properties of quantum-confined systems and their applications in devices."
2019 Stephen Hayden, University of Bristol. "For pioneering studies of spin and charge excitations in cuprate superconductors and other strongly correlated electron systems."
2018 Laura Herz, University of Oxford. "For her ground-breaking research on the fundamental mechanisms underpinning light harvesting, energy conversion and charge conduction in semiconducting materials."
2017 Michael Finnis, Imperial College London. "For his original, insightful and courageous work in materials physics, which is recognised worldwide as having consistently opened up large areas of materials physics to rigorous theory and computation."
2015 John Saunders, Royal Holloway, University of London. "For ground-breaking studies at the frontiers of ultra-low temperature physics."
2013 Andrew James Shields, Toshiba Research Europe Ltd. "For his research on semiconductor sources and detectors of quantum light states, as well as their application to secure communication on optical fibres, quantum-enhanced sensing and quantum computing."
2011 Andrew Peter Mackenzie, University of St Andrews. "For his major and original contributions to the physics of strongly correlated electrons in oxides, in particular, their superconductivity and quantum criticality."
2009 Gillian Gehring, University of Sheffield. "For her seminal contributions to magnetism."
2008 Gabriel Aeppli,  London Centre for Nanotechnology and University College London. "For his pioneering and highly influential work on the magnetic properties of novel materials using neutron scattering."
2007 Andre Geim, University of Manchester. "For his discovery of a new class of materials – free-standing two-dimensional crystals – in particular graphene."
2006 Peter Weightman, University of Liverpool.  "For his work on the electronic structure of materials using a variety of laboratory and synchrotron techniques and for his development of Auger spectroscopy and reflection anisotropy spectroscopy."
2005 Athene M Donald, University of Cambridge. "For the development of powerful new methods for the study of the properties of soft condensed matter; in particular colloids, polymers and biological materials."
2004 Ted Forgan, University of Birmingham. "For his influential work on the study of vortices in superconductors."
2003 D. Phillip Woodruff, University of Warwick. "For his contributions to the field of surface and interface science."
2002 Maurice Sidney Skolnick, University of Sheffield. "For major contributions to the understanding of excitons, defects, and interaction phenomena in semiconductors."
2001 Manuel Cardona, Max Planck Institute of Solid State Research. "For his broad and important contributions to the detailed understanding of the optical and electronic properties of solids."
2000 Michael Pepper, University of Cambridge. "For pioneering work on electronic properties of low dimensional systems and mesoscopic physics."

See also
 Institute of Physics Awards
 List of physics awards
 List of awards named after people

References

External links
 

Awards established in 1997
Awards of the Institute of Physics
Condensed matter physics awards